Adam Tarło (1713–1744) was a Polish nobleman (szlachcic).

Biography
Tarło was voivode of Lublin Voivodeship since 1736 and starost of Jasło.

During the War of Polish Succession (1734-1738) he supported Stanisław I Leszczyński and was commander of partisans of the short-lived Dzików Confederation.  He was killed by Count Kazimierz Poniatowski in a duel in 1744.

See also
Lublin Voivode

Notes

Military personnel of the Polish–Lithuanian Commonwealth
1713 births
1744 deaths
Polish–Lithuanian military personnel of the War of the Polish Succession
Adam
Duelling fatalities